The Shadow Minister of Agriculture, Fisheries and Food was a member of the UK Shadow Cabinet responsible for the scrutiny of the Ministers of Agriculture, Fisheries and Food and his/her ministry, the Ministry of Agriculture, Fisheries and Food.

Shadow Secretaries of State 

From 2001 the Shadow Minister of Agriculture, Fisheries and Food was dissolved and responsibility formerly transferred to the Shadow Secretary of State for Environment, Food and Rural Affairs.

See also 

Minister of Agriculture, Fisheries and Food
UK Shadow Cabinet

Official Opposition (United Kingdom)